Brvnik is a village in the municipalities of Domaljevac-Šamac, Posavina Canton and Šamac, Republika Srpska, Bosnia and Herzegovina.

Demographics 
According to the 2013 census, its population was 296, with 256 living in the Šamac part and 40 in the Domaljevac-Šamac part.

References

Populated places in Domaljevac
Populated places in Šamac, Bosnia and Herzegovina
Villages in Republika Srpska